The 2021 Mackay Cutters season was the 14th in the club's history. Coached by Michael Crawley and captained by Ross Bella, they competed in the Intrust Super Cup.

The 2021 season marked the return of the Cutters after the 2020 season was cancelled after just one round due to the COVID-19 pandemic.

Season summary

Milestones
 Round 1: Aidan Beard, Michael Bell, Ben Condon, Brandon Finnegan, Kyle Krisanski-Kennedy, Jaymon Moore, Sean Mullany, Blake Paskins, Jack Quinn, Josh Smith, Matiu Stone-Dunn and Murray Taulagi made their debuts for the club.
 Round 1: Kyle Krisanski-Kennedy, Blake Paskins, Josh Smith and Matiu Stone-Dunn scored their first tries for the club.
 Round 2: Luke Webley made his debut for the club.
 Round 3: Kane Bradley and Morgan McWhirter made their debuts for the club.
 Round 3: Michael Bell and Kane Bradley scored their first tries for the club.
 Round 4: Shaun Edwards made his debut for the club.
 Round 4: Brandon Finnegan and Sean Mullany scored their first tries for the club.
 Round 6: Jake Riley made his debut for the club.
 Round 7: Paul Bryan and Keanu Wainohu-Kemp made their debuts for the club.
 Round 8: Daejarn Asi and Brenton Baira made their debuts for the club.
 Round 8: Brenton Baira and Keanu Wainohu-Kemp scored their first tries for the club.
 Round 9: Jake Riley scored his first try for the club.
 Round 10: Jesse Dee scored his first try for the club. 
 Round 11: Jack Quinn scored his first try for the club.
 Round 13: Bayley Gill and Jake Thornton made their debuts for the club.
 Round 13: Kellen Jenner scored his first try for the club.
 Round 12: Adam Cook, Kai O'Donnell and Beaudan Dixon made their debuts for the club.
 Round 12: Bayley Gill scored his first try for the club.
 Round 12: Hayden Brownsey made his debut for the club.
 Round 16: Laitia Moceidreke made his debut for the club.
 Round 16: Laitia Moceidreke scored his first try for the club.

2021 squad

Squad movement

Gains

Losses

Fixtures

Pre-season

Regular season
Due COVID-19 lockdowns and restrictions in Queensland throughout the season, Round 12 was postponed and played after Rounds 13 and 14. Rounds 15 and 18 were cancelled and Rounds 16 and 17 were postponed and played after Round 19.

Statistics

Honours

Club
Player of the Year: Ross Bella
Players' Player: Matiu Stone-Dunn
Rookie of the Year: Josh Smith
Club Person of the Year: Marco Peters

References

2021 in Australian rugby league
2021 in rugby league by club
Mackay Cutters